The Kyffhäuserbund is an umbrella organization for war veterans' and reservists' associations in Germany based in Rüdesheim am Rhein. It owes its name to the Kyffhäuser Monument, a memorial built on the summit of the 473 m high Kyffhäuser mountain near Bad Frankenhausen in the state of Thuringia in central Germany.

History 
The Kyffhäuserbund's origins lie in a section of the Deutscher Kriegerbund that established a league in 1900 that would unite the formerly scattered German war veterans' associations. Some of these organizations had been already administrating the maintenance of the memorial together. The league was initially named Kyffhäuser League of the German Countries' Warriors Associations, a name that became later abbreviated to Kyffhäuserbund. By 1913, this umbrella organization had already 2.8 million war veterans as its members and it had become one of the largest societies in Germany. During the time of the German Empire, the Kyffhäuserbund was instrumentalized against the growing social democratic movement in Germany.

The difficult circumstances of World War I's postwar years led to a significant shrinking of the veterans' associations and their role. During the Weimar Republic in 1921, this organization shed its federal structure and centralized itself under a common leadership. Following this step, it changed its name to German Warriors Association Kyffhäuser. In the name of Gleichschaltung, the Kyffhäuserbund was nazified after the Nazi takeover of power in 1933. Five years later, its name was altered to Nationalsocialist Reich Warriors Association Kyffhäuser, becoming the sole and exclusive organization representing the veterans' interests in the Third Reich.

The Kyffhäuserbund was swiftly and unceremoniously disbanded during World War II in March 1943 by Adolf Hitler himself. Apparently, the reason was the German defeat in the Battle of Stalingrad. Its assets in the whole Reich were transferred to the Nazi Party. All its surviving local associations, which in the last phase of the war effort became the breeding ground for Volkssturm units, were also placed under the direct orders of the Nazi Party. After Nazi Germany's defeat in World War II, the Allied military governments issued a special law, Kontrollratsgesetz Nr. 2, for the disbandment and liquidation of the Nazi organizations (Auflösung und Liquidierung der Naziorganisationen) on 10 October 1945. This denazification decree outlawed the Nazi Party and all of its branches, effectively disbanding the Kyffhäuserbund's avatar that had been established during the Third Reich.

The disbandment of the Kyffhäuserbund meant that it had to be established anew during the postwar reconstruction of both West and East Germany.

The reestablishment of the Kyffhäuser organization with federal state branches began in 1952 in West Germany. The present-day Kyffhäuserbund emphasizes its role as a shooting sports association.

Uniforms and Insignia 

 
Like many other nazi paramilitary organizations, they to had ranks and uniforms.

Notable Kyffhäuserverband members 
 Ludwig Bergsträsser
 F. K. Otto Dibelius
 Martin Dibelius
 Johannes Dieckmann
 Hermann Ehlers
 Ferdinand Friedensburg
 Hans Fritzsche
 Heinrich George
 Hellmut von Gerlach
 Leo Geyr von Schweppenburg
 Helmut Hasse
 Richard Heinze
 Rudolf Heinze
 Otto Hoetzsch
 Hubertus, Prince of Löwenstein-Wertheim-Freudenberg
 Gerhard Kittel
 Werner Kollath
 Wilhelm Kube
 Hanfried Lenz
 Max Maurenbrecher
 Joachim Mrugowsky
Ludwig Müller
 Friedrich Naumann
 Karl Ernst Osthaus
 Otto Peltzer
 Kurt Scharf
 Gustav Adolf Scheel
 Percy Ernst Schramm
 Rudi Stephan
 Otmar Freiherr von Verschuer
 Ernst Wahle
 Kuno von Westarp

See also 
 List of veterans organizations
 National Socialist War Victim's Care
 Der Stahlhelm

Notes and references 

 Kyffhäuserbund e.V.
 Kyffhäuser-Bund der Deutschen Landeskriegerverbände e.V. (Historisches Lexikon Bayerns).
 Dieter Fricke et al.: Kyffhäuser-Bund der Deutschen Landeskriegerverbände (KB) 1900-1943. In: Dieter Fricke (Hrsg.): Die bürgerlichen Parteien in Deutschland. Berlin 1968, S.296–312.
 Karl Saul: Der "Deutsche Kriegerbund". Zur innenpolitischen Funktion eines nationalen Verbandes im kaiserlichen Deutschland. In: Militärgeschichtliche Mitteilungen (MGM). 2/1969. S.95–159.
 Karl Führer: Der "Deutsche Reichskriegerbund Kyffhäuser" 1930-1934. Politik, Ideologie und Funktion eines "unpolitischen" Verbandes. In: Militärgeschichtliche Mitteilungen (MGM). 2/1984. S.57–76.
 Heinz Kleene Das Kriegervereinswesen im Emsland zur Zeit des Kaiserreiches In: Jahrbuch des Emsländ. Heimatbundes Sögel 2005. S.137–159.

German veterans' organisations
Kyffhäuser
Non-profit organisations based in Hesse
Shooting sports organizations